Scotty's Castle (also known as Death Valley Ranch) is a two-story Mission Revival and Spanish Colonial Revival style villa located in the Grapevine Mountains of northern Death Valley in Death Valley National Park, California, US. Scotty's Castle is named for gold prospector Walter E. Scott, although Scott never owned it, nor is it an actual castle.

Scotty's Castle was severely damaged by flooding in October 2015, and a fire in 2021 that destroyed the historic garage/workshop that was used as the visitor center. Scotty's Castle is temporarily closed to the public.

History
Construction began on Scotty's Castle in 1922, and cost between $1.5 and $2.5 million. Prospector, performer, and con man Walter Scott, born in Cynthiana, Kentucky, also known as "Death Valley Scotty," convinced Chicago millionaire Albert Mussey Johnson to invest in Scott's gold mine in the Death Valley area. Though initially angered when the mine turned out to be fraudulent, Johnson was fascinated with the colorful Scott and the two men struck up an unlikely friendship.

After Johnson and his wife Bessie made several trips to the region, and his health improved, construction began. It was Mrs. Johnson's idea to build something comfortable for their vacations in the area, and the villa eventually became a winter home.

The Johnsons hired Martin de Dubovay as the architect, Mat Roy Thompson as the engineer and head of construction, and Charles Alexander MacNeilledge as the designer.

Unknown to the Johnsons, the initial survey was incorrect, and the land they built Death Valley Ranch on was actually government land; their land was farther up Grapevine Canyon. Construction halted as they resolved this mistake, but before it could resume, the stock market crashed in 1929, making it difficult for Johnson to finish construction. Having lost a considerable amount of money, the Johnsons used the Death Valley Ranch to produce income by letting rooms out, upon the suggestion of Scott.

The Johnsons died without heirs and had hoped that the National Park Service would purchase the property, and in 1970, the National Park Service purchased the villa for $850,000 from the Gospel Foundation (the socially-oriented charity Johnson founded in 1946), to which the Johnsons had left the property.
Walter Scott, who was taken care of by the Gospel Foundation after Johnson's passing, died in 1954 and was buried on the hill overlooking Scotty's Castle next to a beloved dog.

Tours

In Person 
Approximately 100,000 people tour the villa each year. The Johnsons' original furnishings and clothing can still be seen today. The National Park Service gives guided tours of Scotty's Castle for a fee. Park rangers dress in 1930s style clothes to help take the visitor back in time. During the tour, guests are treated to the sounds of a 1,121-pipe Welte theater organ.

An underground mystery tour is also available for those wishing to see the inner workings of the building. One-quarter mile of tunnels run under the building, where visitors can visit the powerhouse and see thousands of tiles that were to be used for the never-finished swimming pool. The tunnels also contain hundreds of nickel-iron battery cells, used to regulate power and provide backup power. The main house tour is ADA accessible, but the underground tour is not.

Video 
Scotty's Castle is featured in Episode 607 of California's Gold with Huell Howser.

Virtual reality 
Scotty's Castle can be toured in 3D virtual reality from a computer, smartphone, or with VR goggles - the result of a collaboration between the Death Valley Conservancy and the National Park Service.

Water and electricity
The springs of Grapevine Canyon provided the water supply for the ranch and were used to generate electricity. The springs, located about  higher than the villa, generated enough water flow and pressure to turn a Pelton wheel, which ran the generator that furnished the villa's electricity.  The power was regulated and backed up by the large bank of nickel–iron batteries in the house's tunnels. The springs provided enough water to meet all the needs of the ranch, with enough left for other uses.

A water fountain was constructed in the Great Hall, where water dripped down a rock face creating evaporative cooling and into a catch basin for recirculation. A 1930s solar water heater, much larger than today's solar water heaters, is near the main house, and a large stock of railroad ties salvaged from the Tonopah and Tidewater Railroad is in the area.

2015 flood damage
The flood caused the property to be closed for an extended period of time while repairs to the property are carried out and a new access road is built. The NPS has stated that the castle itself is not likely to re-open to the public until 2023, though "flood recovery tours" of the grounds happened between December 2017 and April 14, 2018.

2021 outbuildings fire 
A fire on April 22, 2021 destroyed the historic garage/workshop dating from 1922 that was used as the visitor center, along with another historic outbuilding on the property. Upon investigation, the California Department of Forestry and Fire Protection reported that the fire started inside the Visitor Center. However, investigators were not able to conclusively determine the cause of the fire. While the main castle building was unscathed, this delayed the property rehabilitation efforts and pushed back the public reopening until 2023. The National Park Service intends to rebuild the garage/workshop.

See also
Death Valley National Park

References

External links
  
 National Park Service page on Scotty's Castle
 Interior and exterior photo tours of Scotty's Castle
 Death Valley Conservancy page on Scotty's Castle

Death Valley
Historic house museums in California
American West museums in California
Mojave Desert
Museums in Inyo County, California
Buildings and structures in Inyo County, California
Mission Revival architecture in California
Spanish Colonial Revival architecture in California
Historic districts on the National Register of Historic Places in California
National Register of Historic Places in Inyo County, California
National Register of Historic Places in Death Valley National Park
1931 establishments in California
Houses completed in 1931